Drew Barrymore is an American actress and producer.

Drew Barrymore may also refer to:
 "Drew Barrymore" (song), a 2017 song by Bryce Vine
"Drew Barrymore", a 2017 song by SZA from Ctrl

See also
John Drew Barrymore, American actor and father of Drew Barrymore